WRIW-CD, virtual channel 51 (VHF digital channel 2), is a Class A television station licensed to Providence, Rhode Island, United States. It is a standard-definition translator of Telemundo owned-and-operated station WYCN-LD (channel 8) which is owned by the Telemundo Station Group subsidiary of NBCUniversal. WRIW-CD's parent station maintains studios on Kenney Drive in Cranston (shared with NBC affiliate WJAR [channel 10], owned by the Sinclair Broadcast Group).

Under a channel sharing arrangement, WRIW-CD shares transmitter facilities with PBS member station WSBE-TV (channel 36) on Pine Street in Rehoboth, Massachusetts. Despite WRIW-CD legally holding a low-power Class A license, it transmits using WSBE-TV's full-power spectrum. This ensures complete reception across the Providence–New Bedford, Massachusetts television market.

History
At one point, the station broadcast English-language programming, including locally produced programs hosted by former air talent at WHIM. WRIW-LP became a Telemundo affiliate in 2000; ZGS Communications then acquired the station from Viking Broadcasting in 2003.

On July 29, 2012, WRIW-CA began broadcasting its signal in digital from the WJAR tower in Rehoboth, Massachusetts, and subsequently changed its call sign to WRIW-CD on January 7, 2013.

On December 4, 2017, NBCUniversal's Telemundo Station Group announced its purchase of ZGS' 13 television stations, including WRIW-CD. This made WRIW the second television station in the Providence market to have been an owned-and-operated station under NBC ownership—after WJAR (channel 10, now an NBC affiliate owned by Sinclair Broadcast Group), which was owned by the network from 1996 to 2006. The sale was completed on July 20, 2018.

In October 2019, WRIW-CD began simulcasting low-power WYCN-LD in order to reach the entire Providence−New Bedford market (the latter station changed its city of license to Providence and moved its transmitter to Norton, Massachusetts).

Newscasts
WRIW-CD began simulcasting the newscasts of Boston sister station WNEU on July 20, 2018, immediately following the completion of the sale to NBCUniversal. In the announcement, WNEU president and general manager Mike St. Peter stated his intention to hire a Providence-based reporter for the newscast.

Subchannel

References

External links

Telemundo Station Group
RIW-CD
Spanish-language television stations in the United States
Low-power television stations in the United States
Television channels and stations established in 1993
1993 establishments in Rhode Island